Sorbey is a commune in the Meuse department in Grand Est in north-eastern France.

Geography
The village lies on the right bank of the Othain, which forms most of the commune's southern border.

See also
 Communes of the Meuse department

References

Communes of Meuse (department)